PCI-SIG, or Peripheral Component Interconnect Special Interest Group, is an electronics industry consortium responsible for specifying the Peripheral Component Interconnect (PCI), PCI-X, and PCI Express (PCIe) computer buses.  It is based in Beaverton, Oregon. The PCI-SIG is distinct from the similarly named and adjacently-focused PCI Industrial Computer Manufacturers Group.

It has produced the PCI, PCI-X and PCI Express specifications.

As of 2022, the board of directors of the PCI-SIG has representatives from: AMD, ARM, Dell EMC, IBM, Intel, Synopsys, Keysight, NVIDIA, and Qualcomm. The chairman and president of the PCI-SIG is Al Yanes, a "Distinguished Engineer" from IBM. The executive director of the PCI-SIG is Reen Presnell, president of VTM Group.

Formation 
The PCI Special Interest Group was formed in 1992, initially as a "compliance program" to help computer manufacturers implement the Intel specification. The organization became a nonprofit corporation, officially named "PCI-SIG" in the year 2000.

Membership 
Membership of PCI-SIG is open to all of the microcomputer industry with a $4,000 annual fee. PCI-SIG has a membership of over 800 companies that develop differentiated, interoperable products based on its specifications. PCI-SIG specifications are available to members of the organization as free downloads. Non-members can purchase hard-copy specifications.

See also 
 PICMG

References

External links 
 PCI-SIG

Technology consortia
Standards organizations in the United States
Beaverton, Oregon
Peripheral Component Interconnect